When the White Lilacs Bloom Again (German: Wenn der weiße Flieder wieder blüht) is a 1929 German silent romance film directed by Robert Wohlmuth and starring Georg Henrich, Vera Schmiterlöw and Walter Grüters. It takes its title from a popular song of the era. A 1953 film was made using the same name.

It was made at the Emelka Studios in Munich. The film's sets were designed by Ludwig Reiber.

Cast
 Georg Henrich as v. Zandten  
 Vera Schmiterlöw as Else von Zandten 
 Walter Grüters as Dr. Paul Horst  
 Gaston Jacquet as van der Gaarden  
 Julius Riedmueller as Anton Marr  
 Ferdinand Martini as Diener

References

Bibliography
 Alfred Krautz. International directory of cinematographers, set- and costume designers in film, Volume 4. Saur, 1984.

External links

1929 films
Films of the Weimar Republic
German silent feature films
Films directed by Robert Wohlmuth
Bavaria Film films
Films shot at Bavaria Studios
German black-and-white films